William Gerald Tolhurst (20 April 1931 – 18 August 2013) was a New Zealand chartered accountant and politician of the National Party.

Accountant
Bill Tolhurst was born in Masterton in 1931 son of Wellington sharebroker, Gerald Tolhurst, and his second wife born Noeline Cruickshank. Bill was educated at Wanganui Collegiate School, Victoria University College, and Otago University where he obtained the degree of Bachelor of Commerce.

He worked for Public Accountants Barr, Burgess and Stewart (now PWC) in Wellington from 1948 to 1952 and was admitted to the New Zealand Society of Accountants in June 1952. Then he moved to Barr Burgess's head office in Dunedin. Returning to the North Island he moved to Wanganui working there for Public Accountant G. K. Campbell for a further year before setting up his own independent practice in that city. He was awarded fellowship of the Society of Accountants in June 1969 before he stood for election to parliament.

National Party

Bill Tolhurst was secretary for the National Party in the  electorate from 1956 until 1968, and treasurer for the Waimarino electorate. He represented Wanganui for three years from his election in  until  when he was defeated by Labour's Russell Marshall.

Notes

References

1931 births
2013 deaths
New Zealand National Party MPs
Members of the New Zealand House of Representatives
New Zealand MPs for North Island electorates
People from Masterton
People educated at Whanganui Collegiate School
Victoria University of Wellington alumni
University of Otago alumni